Cousinhood is a 2011 Spanish romantic comedy film written and directed by Daniel Sánchez Arévalo and starring Quim Gutiérrez, Raúl Arévalo and Adrián Lastra. This is the third film of Sanchéz Arévalo, but his very first comedy, and it premiered on 4 February 2011. The film was shot in Comillas (Cantabria) during spring 2010. The film received two nominations for the 26th Goya Awards: Best New Actor (Lastra) and Best Supporting Actor (Arévalo).

Plot
When Diego is abandoned by his girlfriend a day before their wedding, he decides to go with his two cousins, Julian and José Miguel, to the village where they used to go on vacation when they were little to recuperate Diego's first love: Martina. There, the trio will face again their past and some people who took part of it, such as the irreconciliable "El Bachi" and his daughter Clara.

Cast
 Quim Gutiérrez as Diego
 Raúl Arévalo as Julián
 Adrián Lastra as José Miguel
 Inma Cuesta as Martina
 Antonio de la Torre as El Bachi
 Nuria Gago as Yolanda
 Clara Lago as Clara
 Alicia Rubio as Toña
  as Dani

See also
 List of Spanish films of 2011

References

External links
 
 

2011 films
2011 romantic comedy films
2010s Spanish-language films
Films about cousins
Films directed by Daniel Sánchez Arévalo
Spanish romantic comedy films
Atípica Films films
MOD Producciones films
2010s Spanish films